The 2009 Junior Pan American Rhythmic Gymnastics Championships was held in Havana, Cuba, November 10–15, 2009.

Medal summary

References

2009 in gymnastics
Pan American Gymnastics Championships
International gymnastics competitions hosted by Cuba